|}

The Thoroughbred Stakes is a Group 3 flat horse race in Great Britain open to three-year-old horses. It is run at Goodwood over a distance of 1 mile (1,609 metres), and it is scheduled to take place each year in late July or early August.

History
The event was formerly ungraded, and it used to be called the Surplice Stakes. It was sponsored by Vodafone from 1993, and for several years it was known by a sponsored title. It was given Listed status and renamed the Thoroughbred Stakes in 1998.

The race was backed by Blue Square from 2007 to 2010, and by RSA in 2011 and 2012. Since 2013 it has been sponsored by Bonhams. It was promoted to Group 3 level in 2012.

The Thoroughbred Stakes is currently held on the fourth day of the five-day Glorious Goodwood meeting.

Records

Leading jockey since 1986 (6 wins):
 Frankie Dettori – Tamayaz (1995), Cape Cross (1997), Slip Stream (1999), Neebras (2011), Archbishop (2012), Regal Reality (2018)

Leading trainer since 1986 (6 wins):
 Sir Michael Stoute – Sabotage (1989), Hammerstein (1996), Adilabad (2000), Zacinto (2009), Thikriyaat (2016), Regal Reality (2018)

Winners since 1986

See also
 Horse racing in Great Britain
 List of British flat horse races

References

 Racing Post:

 pedigreequery.com – Thoroughbred Stakes – Goodwood.
 ifhaonline.org  International Federation of Horseracing Authorities – Thoroughbred Stakes (2019)

Flat races in Great Britain
Goodwood Racecourse
Flat horse races for three-year-olds